Man in Love (lit. "When a Man Is in Love") is a 2014 South Korean romance drama film about a terminally ill gangster who falls in love for the first, and likely last, time. It stars Hwang Jung-min and Han Hye-jin. It was remade in Taiwan with same name

Plot
Tae-il is a low-level thug who goes around the streets of his neighborhood in Gunsan, collecting debts for a loan shark and harassing shop owners for the protection money owed to the small gang he works for. He is 42 years old, lives with his barber brother Young-il and Young-il's family, and has never been in love. Tae-il does well at his job and doesn't seem to harbor many scruples about it, but then he meets Ho-jung, a bank clerk who is taking care of her debt-ridden, terminally ill father. During their first encounter, Tae-il forces her to sign a contract that requires her to sell her organs if she can't pay back her father's debt on time. After their not-so-pleasant first meeting, however, Tae-il finds himself thinking about Ho-jung constantly and his conscience begins to get the better of him. He writes a new contract and offers it to her: He will exempt her from the debt if she goes on date with him. The more dates she goes on, the less debt she will have to pay off. Ho-jung rejects his offer at first, but knowing that she is unable to make the payments at any cost, she reluctantly agrees. As they start to go on awkward "dates," an unlikely romance blossoms between the two. Following his prolonged courtship, Tae-il tries to leave the gang life behind him, but the break isn't clean. Unfortunately he is soon diagnosed with cancer and his relationship with Ho-jung is suddenly thrown into jeopardy.

Cast
Hwang Jung-min as Han Tae-il
Han Hye-jin as Joo Ho-jung
Kwak Do-won as Han Young-il, Tae-il's brother
Jung Man-sik as Doo-chul
Kim Hye-eun as Mi-young, Young-il's wife
Kang Min-ah as Song-ji, Young-il's daughter
Nam Il-woo as Tae-il's father
Kim Hong-pa as Mr. Park from the health care center
Hwang Byeong-guk as Yang
Kim Byung-ok as Pastor
Nam Moon-chul as Detective Jo
Choi Woo-ri as Mi-sun, bargirl
Son Se-bin as Hye-kyung, Ho-jung's co-worker
Park Ji-hwan as "Gold teeth"
Park Sung-woong as barbershop customer (cameo)
Park Na-rim as radio DJ (cameo)

References

External links
  
  
 
 
 

2014 films
2014 romantic drama films
South Korean romantic drama films
South Korean films remade in other languages
Films about organized crime in South Korea
Next Entertainment World films
2010s South Korean films